Seyedeh Vida Halimian Avval (born September 10, 1988) is an Iranian compound archer. She is the current World Archery number fourteen in women's compound archery. The highest ranking she has reached is the seventh position, which she reached for the last time in July 2011.

Achievements
Source:

2007
10th, Asian Outdoor Championships, individual, Xi'an
2008
 Asian Grand Prix, individual, Tehran
2009
 Asian Grand Prix, individual, Tehran
16th, World Outdoor Championships, women's team, Ulsan
28th, World Outdoor Championships, individual, Ulsan
 Asian Grand Prix, individual, Dakha
 Asian Outdoor Championships, women's team, Bali
4th, Asian Outdoor Championships, individual, Bali
2010
 World Cup, women's team, Antalya
 World Cup, mixed team, Shanghai
 World University Championships, individual, Shenzhen
 World University Championships, women's team, Shenzhen

2011
 World Cup, women's team, Antalya
 World Outdoor Championships, women's team, Turin
17th, World Outdoor Championships, individual, Turin
4th, Summer Universiade, mixed team, Shenzhen
5th, Summer Universiade, individual, Shenzhen
6th, Summer Universiade, women's team, Shenzhen
4th, World Cup Final, individual, Istanbul
9th, Asian Outdoor Championships, individual, Tehran

References

External links
 

Iranian female archers
1988 births
Living people
World Archery Championships medalists
21st-century Iranian women